Cryopedology is any study relating to the behavior of frozen snow.  The shapes into which frozen snow is blown by the wind (e.g. on the tundra) are said to be 'cryopedological formations'. The ways in which frozen snow behaves due to factors intrinsic to itself and relating to environments are 'cryopedological processes'. The term cryopedology was first introduced by geologist Kirk Bryan in 1946.

References 

Snow

External links